Usman Danjuma Shiddi (born 1967 also known as Danji SS) is a Nigerian politician and legislator currently representing the Ibi/Wukari Federal Constituency of Taraba State at the Federal House of Representatives in Nigerian National Assembly. In 2019 he won the House of Representative seat with 39,312 votes defeating his closest rival, Yakubu Aliyara of Action Alliance (AA) who got 22,147 votes. Shiddi is the Chairman House Committee on Internal Security of the 9th Nigeria House of Representative Assembly and in 2020 defected to the All Progressives Congress.

See also 

 List of Hausa people

References 

1967 births
Living people
People from Taraba State
Members of the House of Representatives (Nigeria)